Memphis Reds may refer to:
Memphis Reds (League Alliance), a Minor League Baseball team that played in 1877
Memphis Reds (Southern League), a Minor League Baseball team that played in 1885